Vagharshak Aramais Grigoryan (born in Martakert, Karabagh 1917 - died 1980) was a Soviet medical doctor and a respected professor.

Biography 
He died in 1980 at the age of 63.

References 
 Outstanding people of Karabagh

Soviet surgeons
Soviet Armenians
1917 births
1980 deaths